Euryxanthops is a genus of crabs in the family Xanthidae. It was originally established in 1983 by Garth & Kim to contain three species of deep-water crabs from Japan and the Philippines - Euryxanthops dorsiconvexus, Euryxanthops flexidentatus and Euryxanthops orientalis. Since then, several more species of this genus have been identified and described, and Euryxanthops currently contains:

 Euryxanthops cepros Davie, 1997
 Euryxanthops chiltoni Ng & McLay, 2007
 Euryxanthops dorsiconvexus Garth & Kim, 1983
 Euryxanthops flexidentatus Garth & Kim, 1983
 Euryxanthops latifrons Davie, 1997
 Euryxanthops orientalis (Sakai, 1939)

References

Xanthoidea